Arthur Spiethoff (13 May 1873, Düsseldorf – 4 April 1957, Tübingen) was a German economist, born in Düsseldorf.  He studied economics at the University of Berlin, and later taught in Prague and Bonn.

German economists
1873 births
1957 deaths